Christopher Cheboiboch (born 3 March 1977) is a Kenyan long-distance runner who competes in the marathon. He has won the Leipzig Marathon and the San Diego Marathon and was the runner-up at the 2002 New York City Marathon. He represented his country at the 2003 World Championships in Athletics, but did not finish the marathon race.

Achievements

Marathons 
2001 Nashville Marathon - 1st
2002 Boston Marathon - 2nd
2002 New York City Marathon - 2nd
2003 Boston Marathon - 5th
2003 New York City Marathon - 3rd
2004 New York City Marathon - 6th
2005 Rotterdam Marathon - 5th
2005 Rock 'n' Roll San Diego Marathon - 1st
2006 Rotterdam Marathon - 7th
2007 Chicago Marathon - 6th
2007 Las Vegas Marathon -1st

Half marathons 
2004 City-Pier-City Loop (the Hague) - 1st.

Personal bests
Half marathon - 1:00:49 hrs (2000)
Marathon - 2:08:17 hrs (2002)

References

External links

Kimbia Athletics
Marathoninfo

1977 births
Living people
Kenyan male long-distance runners
Kenyan male marathon runners
20th-century Kenyan people
21st-century Kenyan people